Donald Joseph ""Don" Frank (September 28, 1937 – October 13, 1995) was an American politician.

Biography 
Frank was born in Minnesota and graduated from University of Minnesota with a degree in geology. He was a businessman and consulting engineer. He lived in Spring Lake Park, Minnesota with his wife and family. Frank served on the Spring Lake Park City Council and was a Democrat. Frank served in the Minnesota Senate from 1981 to 1992. He died in Brooklyn Park, Minnesota at his place of work.

References

1937 births
1995 deaths
People from Spring Lake Park, Minnesota
University of Minnesota alumni
Businesspeople from Minnesota
Minnesota city council members
Democratic Party Minnesota state senators